Martin Luther King Jr. Shoreline is a regional park located on the shores of the San Leandro Bay in Oakland, California. Part of the East Bay Regional Parks system, it is named after Civil Rights Movement leader Martin Luther King Jr. The park was established in 1993 on a  tract of land leased from the Oakland Airport.

Facilities
 The Shoreline Center is an indoor-outdoor venue that is available for parties, weddings, corporate, school and other group events. It contains a main room, an outdoor deck and a commercial kitchen. Catering can be provided. The facility is rated for 60 guests (seated) or 125 (standing).
 The Tidewater Boating Center is a complex that includes an ADA-accessible dock, a boat house and boat storage area, training area, Recreation Department offices and a security residence.

References

East Bay Regional Park District
Parks in Oakland, California
San Francisco Bay Trail
Geography of Alameda County, California